Only One Night is a 1922 German silent film directed by Rudolf Walther-Fein and starring Bruno Eichgrün, Joseph Römer, and Olga Engl. It was one of several German silent films featuring the detective Nick Carter.

Cast

References

Bibliography

External links

1922 films
Films of the Weimar Republic
German silent feature films
Films directed by Rudolf Walther-Fein
German black-and-white films
Nick Carter (literary character)
1920s German films